Margarita Mimi Baez Fariña (April 30, 1945 – July 18, 2001) was an American singer-songwriter and activist, the youngest of three daughters to a Scottish mother and Mexican-American physicist Albert Baez. She was the younger sister of the singer and activist Joan Baez.

Career

Early years
Fariña's father, a physicist affiliated with Stanford University and MIT, moved his family frequently due to his job assignments, working in the United States and in international locations. She benefited from dance and music lessons, and took up the guitar, joining the 1960s American folk music revival.

Fariña met novelist, musician, and composer Richard Fariña in 1963, when she was 17 years old, and married him at age 18 in Paris. The two collaborated on a number of influential folk albums, most notably, Celebrations for a Grey Day (1965) and Reflections in a Crystal Wind (1966), both on Vanguard Records. After Richard Fariña's death on April 30, 1966 (on Mimi's twenty-first birthday) in a motorcycle accident, she  moved to San Francisco, where she flourished as a singer, songwriter, model, actress, and activist. She performed at various festivals and clubs throughout the Bay Area, including the Big Sur Folk Festivals, the Matrix, and the hungry i. Fariña briefly sang for the rock group the Only Alternative and His Other Possibilities. In 1967, Fariña joined a satiric comedy troupe called The Committee. That same year, she and her sister Joan Baez were arrested at a peaceful demonstration, where the two were housed temporarily in Santa Rita Jail, personalizing the experience of captivity for her. In 1968, Fariña married Milan Melvin and continued to perform, sometimes recording and touring with either her sister Joan or the folksinger Tom Jans, with whom she recorded an album in 1971, entitled Take Heart. Fariña and Milan divorced in 1971.

Among the songs she has written is "In the Quiet Morning (for Janis Joplin)", which her sister recorded and released in 1972 on the album Come from the Shadows. The song is also included on a number of compilations, including Joan Baez's Greatest Hits.

By 1973, Fariña was asked to accompany her sister Joan and B.B. King when they performed for the prisoners in Sing Sing Prison. This experience, along with her arrest in 1967, led her to a desire to do more for those who are held in institutions.

Bread and Roses
In 1974, Fariña founded Bread and Roses, now known as Bread and Roses Presents. The organization's name came from "Bread and Roses", a 1912 poem by James Oppenheim, which is commonly associated with a 1912 garment workers strike in Lawrence, Massachusetts.

Bread and Roses is in its fifth decade as a non-profit organization, bringing free live music and entertainment to children, adults, and seniors who are isolated in institutional settings: children's day care and special needs schools, hospitals, adult and juvenile detention facilities, homeless shelters, adult recovery centers, senior day and convalescent homes. Bread and Roses serves isolated audiences in eight counties in the San Francisco Bay Area, and consults with other like-minded programs nationally. In 2019, Bread and Roses brought performers to play more than 600 concerts in over 120 institutions.

Though she continued to sing in her later years, releasing an album in 1985 and performing sporadically, Fariña devoted most of her time to running Bread and Roses. In the late 1980s, she teamed with Pete Sears to play a variety of benefit and protest concerts. Many concerts were concerned with human rights issues in Central America, especially the U.S.-backed civil wars in Guatemala and El Salvador. They once set up to play on the abandoned railroad tracks outside the Concord Naval Weapons Center in California. Surrounded by military police, Fariña and Sears played a show for people protesting U.S. weapons being shipped to government troops in El Salvador.

In 1986, she recorded her own album Mimi Fariña Solo. Bread and Roses also has a CDproduced by Banana, aka Lowell Levinger, with Michael Kleffof a series of concerts that she gave with Banana in Germany in the 1980s.

Fariña used her connections with the folk-singing community to elicit help in supporting Bread and Roses, including Pete Seeger, Paul Winter, Odetta, Hoyt Axton, Judy Collins, Taj Mahal, Lily Tomlin, Carlos Santana, Bonnie Raitt, and others.

Death and legacy
Fariña died of neuroendocrine cancer at her home in Mill Valley, California on July 18, 2001, at age 56. A memorial service was held on August 7 at Grace Cathedral in San Francisco. Eulogies from Joan Baez, Paul Liberatore and Lana Severn were heard by the 1,200 people who attended.

The life of Mimi Fariña is partially chronicled in David Hajdu's book Positively 4th Street. She is referenced in the Armistead Maupin novel Tales of the City, set in San Francisco in the 1970s, and she appeared in a cameo role in the 1993 miniseries based on the novel.

She is referred to by Carol Ward (Catherine O'Hara) in the U.S. television series Six Feet Under, in which it is stated that Fariña had been involved with the production of the (fictitious) Pack Up Your Sorrows: The Mimi Fariña Story. She also was the subject of sister Joan Baez' 1969 song "Sweet Sir Galahad".

She appears in the 2012 documentary Greenwich Village: Music That Defined a Generation.

Selected discography
 1965: Celebrations for a Grey Day with Richard Fariña, Vanguard Records
 1966: Reflections in a Crystal Wind with Richard Fariña, Vanguard Records
 1968: Memories with Richard Fariña, Vanguard Records
 1971: Take Heart with Tom Jans, A&M Records
 1985: Mimi Farina Solo, Rounder Records
 2001: The Complete Vanguard Recordings with Richard Fariña, Vanguard Records
 2018: Mimi Fariña with Lowell Levinger (Banana from The Youngbloods) Grandpa Raccoon Records

References

External links
Allusions to Richard or Mimi Fariña
Still Shots Performance on Rainbow Quest
News Film footage of Joan Baez and Mimi Fariña (in the background) being released from jail October 26, 1967.
Tribute from Bread & Roses site
Obituary in Marin Independent Journal
Bread & Roses, non-profit organization founded by Mimi to bring live entertainment to those who are in institutions
Mimi Farina at Find-A-Grave
Mimi Fariña and Joan Baez

1945 births
2001 deaths
American women singer-songwriters
American folk singers
American musicians of Mexican descent
Deaths from cancer in California
Hispanic and Latino American musicians
Vanguard Records artists
Rounder Records artists
20th-century American singers
Musicians from Palo Alto, California
Singer-songwriters from California
Joan Baez
20th-century American women singers
American people of Scottish descent
Hispanic and Latino American women singers